Joyce Denise Daley is a Jamaican politician from the People's National Party. She is a member of the shadow cabinet.

References 

Living people
21st-century Jamaican women politicians
21st-century Jamaican politicians
Members of the House of Representatives of Jamaica
People's National Party (Jamaica) politicians
People from Saint Catherine Parish
Year of birth missing (living people)
Members of the 12th Parliament of Jamaica
Members of the 13th Parliament of Jamaica
Members of the 14th Parliament of Jamaica